Roger Loysch (born 13 November 1951) is a former Belgian racing cyclist. He finished in last place in the 1977 Tour de France.

References

External links

1951 births
Living people
Belgian male cyclists
People from Houthalen-Helchteren
Cyclists from Limburg (Belgium)